Idealist is a 1976 Yugoslav drama film directed by Igor Pretnar. It was entered into the 10th Moscow International Film Festival where Radko Polič won the award for Best Actor.

Cast
 Radko Polič as Martin Kacur
 Milena Zupančič as Toncka
 Dare Ulaga as Ferjan
 Stevo Žigon as Priest from Zapolje
 Arnold Tovornik as Priest from Blatni Dol
 Bert Sotlar as Mayor from Blatni Dol
 Janez Albreht as Grajzar
 Marjeta Gregorac as Minka

References

External links
 

1976 films
1976 drama films
Slovene-language films
Slovenian drama films
Yugoslav drama films
Films set in Yugoslavia
Films set in Slovenia